Edgar Beck (12 April 1889 – 28 August 1961) was a South African cricketer. He played in three first-class matches for Eastern Province in 1908/09.

See also
 List of Eastern Province representative cricketers

References

External links
 

1889 births
1961 deaths
South African cricketers
Eastern Province cricketers
Cricketers from Port Elizabeth